Free Dirt is the first full-length album by Australian alternative rock band Died Pretty, released in 1986. The album was repackaged in 2008 by Aztec Music with a second CD containing seven singles and six live recordings from 1986.

Critical reception
Trouser Press wrote: "The highly recommended album — which contains glimmers of the ’60s, Dylan, Gram Parsons, folk-rock and neo-psychedelic — uses guest contributions of mandolin, violin, pedal steel and sax to magnify the band’s own essential variety."

Track listing
All songs written by Brett Myers and Ron Peno, except where noted.
"Blue Sky Day" – 3:29
"Round and Round" – 2:41
"Wig-Out" – 3:06
"Laughing Boy" – 3:34
"Through Another Door" (Myers) – 3:17
"Life to Go (Landsakes)" – 5:31
"Just Skin" (Myers) – 6:37
"The 2000 Year Old Murder" – 4:31
"Next to Nothing" – 6:47
"Stoneage Cinderella" (Atkinson, Myers, Peno) – 3:19

1992 re-release bonus track
<LI>"Yesterday's Letters" (Myers) – 4:56

Personnel
Frank Brunetti – keyboards
Tim Fagan – saxophone
Graham Lee – pedal steel
Mark Lock – bass
Brett Myers – guitar, vocals
John Papanis – mandolin
Ron S. Peno – vocals
Louis Tillett – piano
Julian Watchhorn – violin
Chris Welsh – percussion, drums

References

External links
DiedPretty.com

1986 debut albums
Died Pretty albums